"Summer Cannibals" is a rock song written by Patti Smith and Fred "Sonic" Smith, and released as a lead single from Patti Smith 1996 album Gone Again. The song derives from a song Fred "Sonic" Smith wrote and played with his pre-Sonic Rendezvous Band, Ascension in September 1973. Ascension included Michael Davis on vocals and John Hefti on bass.

Music video
The music video was produced by Michael H. Shamberg and directed by Robert Frank.

Track listing

First release

Second release

Release history

Notes

External links 
 

1996 singles
Patti Smith songs
Songs written by Patti Smith
Songs written by Fred "Sonic" Smith
1996 songs
Arista Records singles